The 1970 Baltimore Colts season was the 18th season for the team in the National Football League (NFL). Led by first-year head coach Don McCafferty, the Colts finished the  season with a regular season record of 11 wins, 2 losses and 1 tie to win the first AFC East title. The Colts completed the postseason in Miami with a victory over the Cowboys in Super Bowl V, their first Super Bowl title and third world championship (1958, 1959, and 1970). The Baltimore Colts would not return to a championship game again.

In February 1970, head coach Don Shula departed after seven seasons for the Miami Dolphins, now in the same division, and offensive backfield coach McCafferty was promoted in early April.

NFL Draft

Personnel

Staff/Coaches

Final roster

Preseason

Regular season

Schedule

Game summaries

Week 1

Week 2

Week 3

Week 4

Week 5 
This was the Super Bowl III rematch and it was truly a rematch but this time it favors the Colts as they opened up a 19–0 lead and never looked back. The Jets did mount a challenge led by Joe Namath's 392 yards passing, but he also had 6 interceptions as the Colts gain some revenge on this day.

Week 6

Week 7

Week 8

Week 11

Week 12

Week 13 

    
    
    
    
    
    

The Colts clinched the division title with the win.

Week 14 

    
    
    
    
    
    
    
    
    

 Earl Morrall 18/33, 348 Yds

Standings

Postseason 

The team made it to the playoffs with the best record in the AFC. The Colts hosted both AFC playoff games that they played in. (It wasn't until the 1975 season that playoff teams were seeded by record; the fact that the Colts hosted both playoff games was just due to the rotation set up with the AFL–NFL merger.) The team won both AFC playoff games as well as Super Bowl V.

Divisional 

    
    
    

The Colts hosted the Cincinnati Bengals in the divisional round. The Colts relied on their defense, which had carried them all season, to best the Bengals 17–0, holding Cincinnati to only 139 total yards.

Conference Championship 

    
    
    
    
    
    
    
    

The Colts next hosted the Oakland Raiders for the AFC Championship Game. The Colts jumped out to an early lead over the Raiders, 10–3 at halftime. Oakland came back to tie it up early in the 3rd quarter. The Colts would respond with a Jim O'Brien field goal and a second Bulaich touchdown. Johnny Unitas extended the lead with a 68-yard touchdown pass to Ray Perkins that made the score 27–17. The Colts would seal the win with an interception in the end zone.

Super Bowl 

    
    
    
    
    
    

The Colts made it to the Super Bowl for the second time in franchise history and played the Dallas Cowboys for the NFL championship. In the 2nd quarter, Johnny Unitas threw a pass that was tipped twice before John Mackey caught it for a 75-yard score. Later in the quarter Unitas was injured and Earl Morrall completed a sloppy and turnover-filled game: the Colts committed a total of 7 turnovers, the Cowboys 4. Following an interception by Mike Curtis, Jim O'Brien kicked the game-winning 32-yard field goal, giving Baltimore a 16–13 lead with 5 seconds left in the game, and the victory.

References

See also 
 History of the Indianapolis Colts
 Indianapolis Colts seasons
 Colts–Patriots rivalry
 

Baltimore Colts
1970
AFC East championship seasons
American Football Conference championship seasons
Super Bowl champion seasons
Baltimore Colts